Monster Bash is a pinball machine produced by Williams. The game features some Universal Monsters including The Creature from the Black Lagoon, The Wolf Man, Frankenstein's monster, the Bride of Frankenstein, Dracula and The Mummy.

Description
The main goal of the game is to collect the instruments of the iconic horror characters and form the Monsters of Rock band. The table includes a Phantom Flip; when this feature is enabled, the player can let go of the flipper buttons and allow the game to attempt a shot.

The machine has an easter egg mode called “Lyman’s Lament”. It features different music and comments of programmer Lyman Sheats while the ball is played. The game uses the DCS Sound System.

In 2018, Chicago Gaming announced they would begin production of a Monster Bash remake as part of their series of classic pinball remakes, which includes Medieval Madness and Attack From Mars.

Modes
Each of the six monsters has an associated mode that must be played in order to earn his/her instrument.

 Full Moon Fever: Shoot the left/right orbits a total of four times to start a hurry-up countdown. Each additional shot to an orbit collects the points and resets the countdown to a higher value. Four hurry-up shots are needed to collect the Wolf Man's drum kit.
 Creature Feature: Shoot the Creature's lagoon four times to start a hurry-up, then hit any lit shot (left/right ramps, left/right orbits, center lane) to collect it and start a 20-second timer. The remaining four shots each award increasing multiples of the hurry-up score and reset the timer, and all of them must be made to earn the Creature's saxophone. Shooting the lagoon credits the player with one shot, awards the relevant points, and resets the timer.
 Ball and Chain: Shoot the left and right ramps three times each, then hit them three more times each within 30 seconds to receive the Bride of Frankenstein's microphone. The clock can be reset up to three times during this mode by shooting the center lane.
 Frankenstein Multiball: Two standup targets block the center ramp. Repeated hits light the body parts of Frankenstein's monster; once all six are lit, the standups sink below the field and the player can shoot the ramp to start a three-ball multiball. In order to collect the monster's keyboard, the player must score six super jackpots by hitting a figurine of the monster, which swings down to block the ramp. Regular jackpots can be collected by making any other lit shot.
 Mummy Mayhem: Hit the jet bumpers a set number of times, then shoot the center scoop. In order to light the Mummy's bass guitar, the player must score a set number of points within 45 seconds; all major shots are lit for jackpots. Completing the mode early awards bonus points for any time left on the clock.
 Drac Attack: Hit the "Drac Attack" standup targets a total of seven times, then shoot the center scoop to start a 30-second timer. The player must then hit a figurine of Dracula as it moves on a curved track, with the timer resetting after each hit. His guitar is awarded after five hits.

The player can earn "monster bomb" items, which can be used to make progress during the associated modes by pressing the ball launch button. Each item is specific to one monster, such as a garlic clove for Dracula or a silver bullet for the Wolf Man.

Multiballs
In addition to Frankenstein Multiball (see "Modes" above), the game includes three other multiballs, all of which are started by shooting the center scoop once they are enabled.

 Mosh Pit Multiball: Enabled by shooting the center lane a set number of times. All shots are lit for jackpots. This mode starts with two balls; up to two more may be added, one at a time, by shooting the center lane.
 Monster Bash: This is a wizard mode that is enabled as soon as the player has started all six modes. A four-ball multiball in which all shots are lit for jackpots. 
 Monsters of Rock: This is a different wizard mode that is enabled only by lighting all six instruments. The player receives a bonus for all instruments collected, plus an additional bonus for every complete set. A four-ball multiball in which all shots are lit for larger jackpots than those in Monster Bash. If the player starts Monster Bash and collects all remaining instruments while it is in progress, it is immediately replaced by Monsters of Rock and any previously drained balls are re-launched.

The monsters become unlit after playing Monster Bash, while both the monsters and instruments become unlit after playing Monsters of Rock. In both cases, the player can immediately begin making progress toward relighting them.

If the player starts Frankenstein Multiball, Mosh Pit Multiball, or Monster Bash while any modes are running, the modes continue with their timers frozen as long as two or more balls are on the field. Once all balls have drained except one, the timers begin to run again. Monsters of Rock terminates any active modes without completing them.

Digital versions
Monster Bash was formerly available as a table of The Pinball Arcade until June 30, 2018 when it was taken down from digital stores after the license expired. It is available in an add-on pack for Pinball FX 3.

See also
Class of 1812 (pinball)

References

External links

Pinball Archive rule sheet
Monster Bash development cycle

Williams pinball machines
1998 pinball machines
Works based on Frankenstein
Works based on Dracula